Novosyolovo is a rural locality (a village) in Kopninskoye Rural Settlement, Sobinsky District, Vladimir Oblast, Russia. The population was 26 as of 2010.

Geography 
Novosyolovo is located on the Silunikha River, 24 km southwest of Sobinka (the district's administrative centre) by road. Zarechnoye is the nearest rural locality.

References 

Rural localities in Sobinsky District